The Women's 800 Freestyle at the 10th FINA World Swimming Championships (25m) was swum on 16 December 2010 in Dubai, United Arab Emirates. 28 individuals swam the event, which was a timed-final where the top-8 seeded swimmers swam in the evening and the rest of the field swam in the morning session. All times were then ranked for final placings.

At the start of the event, the existing World (WR) and Championship records (CR) were:
WR: 8:04.53,  Alessia Filippi, (Rijeka, 12 December 2008)
CR: 8:08.25,  Rebecca Adlington, (Manchester 2008)

Results

References

Freestyle 0800 metre, Women's
World Short Course Swimming Championships
2010 in women's swimming